Streett may refer to:

People
 Harry Streett Baldwin (1894–1952), U.S. Congressman from 1943 to 1947
 Joseph M. Streett (1838–1921), American politician and newspaper editor
 St. Clair Streett (1893–1970), United States Air Force major general and writer who first organized and led the Strategic Air Command

Other uses
 Col. John Streett House, historic home located at Street, Harford County, Maryland, United States
 Streett automaton, a class of ω-automaton, a variation of finite automaton that runs on infinite, rather than finite, strings as input

See also
Streat
Street
Strete